Princess Marie of Baden (Marie Amalie; 20 November 1834, in Karlsruhe – 21 November 1899, in Amorbach) was the third daughter and seventh child of Leopold, Grand Duke of Baden (1790–1852) and his wife Princess Sophie of Sweden (1801–65). She was Princess of Leiningen through her marriage with Ernst Leopold, 4th Prince of Leiningen.

Family 

Princess Marie was born on 20 November 1834, in Karlsruhe as Marie Amalie, Princess and Margravine of Baden. She was the third daughter and seventh child of Grand Duke Leopold of Baden and Princess Sophie Wilhelmine of Sweden.

Marie’s father, Grand Duke Leopold, descended from a morganatic branch of the Baden family (his mother was Louise Caroline of Hochberg, a noblewoman) and thus did not have rights to a princely status or the sovereign rights of the House of Zähringen of Baden. However, in 1830 he ascended to the throne of the Grand Duchy of Baden after the main male line of his family died out. Leopold was considered the first German ruler who held in his country's liberal reforms. Her mother, Sophie Wilhelmine of Sweden, was a daughter of King Gustav IV Adolf of Sweden and Frederica of Baden.

Marriage and issue 
On 11 September 1858 in Karlsruhe Marie married Ernst Leopold, 4th Prince of Leiningen (1830–1904), the elder of two sons born to Carl, 3rd Prince of Leiningen (1804 - 1856), and Countess Marie von Klebelsberg (1806 - 1880). Prince Carl of Leiningen was the maternal half-brother of Queen Victoria of the United Kingdom. They had two children :

Princess Alberta of Leiningen (24 December 1863 – 30 August 1901).
Prince Emich of Leiningen (18 January 1866 – 18 July 1939); became 5th Prince of Leiningen on his father's death in 1904; married Princess Feodore of Hohenlohe-Langenburg (1866–1932).

Ancestry

References

External links

Portrait at the NPG 

1834 births
1899 deaths
House of Zähringen
Nobility from Karlsruhe
Princesses of Baden
Leiningen family
Princesses of Leiningen
Daughters of monarchs